Who Is Sylvia? is a 1967 British television sitcom which aired on ITV. It stars Charlie Drake as a man in search of wife who enlists the help of a marriage bureau run by Mrs. Proudpiece (Kathleen Byron) with predictably disastrous results.

Actors who appeared in episodes of the series include Leslie Dwyer, Ballard Berkeley, Victor Maddern, Pauline Collins, Sally Bazely, Austin Trevor, Justine Lord, Martin Benson, Shirley Stelfox, Henry McGee, George Woodbridge, Petra Markham, Michael Balfour and Wally Patch.

5 out of the 7 episodes made survive, The two episodes which are lost are episodes 5 and 6.

Cast
 Charlie Drake as Charles Rameses Drake
 Kathleen Byron as Mrs. Proudpiece

References

Bibliography
 Howard Maxford. Hammer Complete: The Films, the Personnel, the Company. McFarland, 2018.

External links
 
 

1967 British television series debuts
1967 British television series endings
1960s British comedy television series
English-language television shows
ITV sitcoms
Television shows produced by Associated Television (ATV)
Television series by ITV Studios